Dakowy Mokre  is a village in the administrative district of Gmina Opalenica, within Nowy Tomyśl County, Greater Poland Voivodeship, in west-central Poland.

The village has a population of 509.

Notable people
Jan Sokolowski (1899 - 1982) - ornithologist

References

Dakowy Mokre